Zarakas is a municipal unit and a former municipality in Laconia, Peloponnese, Greece. Since the 2011 local government reform it is part of the Monemvasia municipality. The municipal unit has an area of 237.226 km2. Population 1,378 (2011). The seat of the municipality was in the town of Reichea. The municipal unit consists of the following local communities (constituent villages between brackets):
Charakas
Ierakas (Agios Ioannis, Ariana, Ierakas, Limenas Ierakos, Longari)
Kyparissi (Kapsala, Kyparissi, Mitropoli, Paralia)
Lampokampos (Lampokampos, Pistamata)
Reichea (Belesaiika, Reichea)

References

Populated places in Laconia
Monemvasia